is the 1st track on Japanese actress/singer Hiroko Yakushimaru's 1984 debut album . It was written by singer-songwriter Mariya Takeuchi. Takeuchi recorded her own version of the song for her Request album, released in 1987. It was released as a single from the album in 1988.

Mariya Takeuchi version

Mariya Takeuchi, the writer of the song, recorded her own version in 1987. It was originally released as the B-side of her  single in 1987, however was later added to her self-cover album, Request. After being selected for use as a commercial song for watchmaker Seiko's  range in 1988, the song was released as the album's 5th single.

Hiroko Yakushimaru features background vocals in Takeuchi's self-cover.

The B-side, Oh No, Oh Yes!, is a self-cover of a song Takeuchi wrote for singer Akina Nakamori's 1986 album Crimson. This song is also present on Takeuchi's self-cover album Request.

While not doing well on the charts in its single format, the song has been recognised as one of Takeuchi's signature songs. It was re-recorded twice: once on Takeuchi's 1987 self-cover album Request and once as the '08 New Remaster on her 2008 single, . The song has appeared on her greatest hits compilations Impressions (1994) and Expressions (2008). The song is frequently covered by other artists.

Track listing

Chart Rankings

Oricon Charts (Japan)

Shimatani Hitomi version

Hitomi Shimatani covered this song and released it as her 11th single on June 4, 2003. It was as a theme song for 7 of the 27 serial dramas in NHK's special NHK Yoru no Renzoku Dorama serial dramas, over a period of 6 and 1/2 months.

Shimatami performed the song at the 54th Kōhaku Uta Gassen annual New Year's Eve music variety show at the end of 2003.

The song appears on her third album Gate: Scena III as the Gate Version. This version is the version used for her 2003 greatest hits album, Delicious!: The Best of Hitomi Shimatani. The original version appears on her second greatest hits album, Best & Covers, released in 2009.

Track listing

Chart Rankings

Oricon Charts (Japan)

Various charts

Other cover versions
 (1987, Cantonese, 手掌上的電話號碼, album 露雲娜'87, Hong Kong)
Patrick Tam (1989, Cantonese, 泡沫裏的夢, album 為你解悶, Hong Kong)
Jessica：Lín Yŭpíng (1991, Mandarin, 清醒之後(Pinyin: Qīngxĭng-Zhī Hòu), album Jiŭbié Chóngféng, Taiwan)
Eric Martin (2003, Compilation album Sincerely...II〜Mariya Takeuchi Songbook〜)
Cyndi Wang (2005, Mandarin, 打起精神來(Pinyin: Dăqĭ Jīngshén Lái), album Cyndi with U, Taiwan) 
Chara (2009, single Kataomoi B-side)
Junichi Inagaki (2009, single Christmas Carol no Koro ni B-side)
Hiromi Iwasaki (2006, album Dear Friends III)
Juju (2008, single Yasashisa de Afureru You ni B-side)
Shizuka Kudō (2002, album Shōwa no Kaidan Vol.1)
Mana Kana (2009, album Futari no Uta 2)
Mitsuki (2008, single Natsu no Montage B-side)
Aoi Teshima (2008, album Niji no Kashū)
Hideaki Tokunaga (2007, album Vocalist 3)

References 

1984 singles
1988 singles
2003 singles
Hitomi Shimatani songs
Shizuka Kudo songs
Mariya Takeuchi songs
Japanese television drama theme songs
1984 songs